Joseph Georges Émile Clément Fecteau (20 April 1933 – 31 December 2017) was a Canadian Roman Catholic bishop.

Fecteau was born in Sainte-Marie, Quebec and was ordained to the priesthood in 1957. He subsequently served as an auxiliary bishop of the Roman Catholic Archdiocese of Québec from 1989 to 1996 and the diocesan bishop of the Roman Catholic Diocese of Sainte-Anne-de-la-Pocatière from 1996 until his retirement in 2008. He died on 31 December 2017, aged 84.

Notes

1933 births
2017 deaths
French Quebecers
People from Sainte-Marie, Quebec
21st-century Roman Catholic bishops in Canada
20th-century Roman Catholic bishops in Canada
Roman Catholic bishops of Sainte-Anne-de-la-Pocatière